Railway Clerks' Mountain House, also known as the Mountain Home, Clerks' Mountain Home, and Orchard Inn, is a historic country inn located near Saluda, Polk County, North Carolina.  The inn ("home") was built in 1926, and is a two-story, six bay, frame building with Colonial Revival and American Craftsman style design influences. It has a hipped roof and features a full width hip-roofed one-story porch supported by slender Tuscan order columns.  Also on the property are three contributing guest cottages built about 1926: the "Paulownia" Cottage, "Boxwood" Cottage, and "Twin Poplar" Cottage.  The property was originally developed by the Brotherhood of Railway Clerks of the Southern Railway System as a summer retreat.  The union retained the property until 1962.

It was added to the National Register of Historic Places in 2000.

References

External links
Orchard Inn website

Hotel buildings on the National Register of Historic Places in North Carolina
Colonial Revival architecture in North Carolina
Hotel buildings completed in 1926
Buildings and structures in Polk County, North Carolina
National Register of Historic Places in Polk County, North Carolina